HD2 may refer to:

 A Euro1080, high-definition television station in Europe
 An HD Radio, FM sub-channel designation
 HD2 (galaxy), one of the farthest galaxies known
 HD 2 (BD+56 3142, SAO 21069), a star in the Henry Draper Catalogue. It is an F5 star located at (J2000.0)
 HTC HD2, a smartphone manufactured by HTC
 Hidden & Dangerous 2, PC game